Hibiscus quattenensis is a species of flowering plant in the genus Hibiscus, in the family Malvaceae. It is found only in Yemen. Its natural habitat is subtropical or tropical dry shrubland.

References

quattenensis
Endemic flora of Socotra
Least concern plants
Taxonomy articles created by Polbot